Panchkula Assembly constituency is one of the 90 assembly seats of Haryana in the Panchkula district of Haryana, India. It is under Ambala (Lok Sabha constituency). It forms a part of a continuous area with the Union Territory of Chandigarh and the city of Mohali.

Members of Legislative Assembly

 2009: Devender Kumar Bansal, Indian National Congress
 2014: Gian Chand Gupta, Bharatiya Janata Party
 2019: Gian Chand Gupta, Bharatiya Janata Party

Election results

2019

2014

References

External links 
 Haryana elections

Panchkula
Panchkula